Kellaways, also known as  Tytherton Kellaways, is a village and former ecclesiastical parish in the present-day civil parish of Langley Burrell Without and ceremonial county of Wiltshire, England. Historically, the name was sometimes given as Gallows.

The manor house is from the 17th century and is Grade II* listed.

There was a water mill on the River Avon, marked as disused on a 1959 map. The present building, now a house, is from the late 17th and 18th centuries; nearby stands the mill-owner's house of c. 1800.

The small church of St Giles was built c. 1800, in ashlar with a slate roof and an octagonal cupola. The building replaced an earlier structure which was attached to the mill, first recorded in 1304. Today the ecclesiastical parish of Tytherton Kellaways is part of the Draycot benefice.

See also
 Kellaways – West Tytherton, River Avon SSSI, Wiltshire, a site of special geological interest

References

External links

Tytherton Kellaways at Genuki

Hamlets in Wiltshire
Former civil parishes in Wiltshire